Mamadou Touré (born 22 October 1992, in Senegal), also known as Thiam Mamadou, is a Senegalese footballer.

External links
 

1992 births
Living people
Senegalese footballers
Hapoel Ramat Gan F.C. players
Hapoel Ra'anana A.F.C. players
Maccabi Sha'arayim F.C. players
Maccabi Herzliya F.C. players
Liga Leumit players
Israeli Premier League players
Senegalese expatriate footballers
Expatriate footballers in Israel
Senegalese expatriate sportspeople in Israel
Association football forwards